This is a list of flags used in Sakha.

National flag

Historical flags

Standards

Ethnic flags

References

Citations

Bibliography

Constitutions

Books

See also 
 Flag of the Sakha Republic
 List of Russian flags

Flag
Flags of the federal subjects of Russia
Sakha
Sakha